Valley of the Dolls is the second studio long-player by the British post-punk band Generation X, which was produced by Ian Hunter.

Production
Valley of the Dolls was recorded at Wessex Sound Studios in Islington in October 1978. The record's working title was 'Intercourse (Old Meets New)', which was superseded by a name taken from a 1966 novel. Ian Hunter was commissioned as the record's producer at Tony James's request, from having been a fan of his work with Mott the Hoople in the early 1970s.

The record was Generation X's second long-player release, and displayed the band transitioning from its origins in the London Punk Rock scene of the late-1970s into a more mainstream rock music sound, with the incorporation of musical influences ranging from Glam Rock, Progressive Rock, and Bruce Springsteen's mid-1970s work, and was in part aimed at providing the band with a means of entry into the United States market, and gearing up the scale of the band's sound to move from playing in club venues to theatres and arenas.

In pre-release music press interviews for the record Billy Idol presented it as a departure from the punk movement by the band: "I think with this album we've exorcised the ghost of punk rock, people always saw punk as unmusical, and we aim to show that we've got ideas, and that we're individuals and not just following what everyone else does. Generation X is its own band. This LP is a lot different from our last, which didn't have enough staying power, this new one doesn't wear off so easily and we think it will last longer."

On release in January 1979 the record performed disappointingly in the UK Albums Chart, and contributed substantially to Generation X's demise as a band at the year's end. In a later interview with the New Musical Express, Tony James, the band's bass-player and song-writing lyricist attributed the record's failure commercially and artistically to: "I was in love with the rock and roll myth. I'd read (Mick Farren's novel) The Tale of Willy's Rats, and thought it was wonderful. I certainly had a romantic vision of rock and roll groups, and I think with the Valley of the Dolls album we reached an all time bottom in that rock and roll romanticism. After the album came out I realised that I'd been talking about things that I didn't really understand, or which even were just not true. Afterwards we realised we had to sing about what we knew about, not what we wished we were."

Concerns from the record's producer Ian Hunter about the technical competence of Generation X's drummer led to the employment for the recording sessions of Clive Bunker as a session musician. Bunker and Laff played together on the tracks, achieving a distinctive double-drum sound.

Singles releases
The album contained the UK singles: "King Rocker", which reached #11 in the UK Singles Chart in January 1979; "Valley of the Dolls", which reached #23 in April, and "Fridays Angels" in June 1979, which failed to enter the top 40.

Chart performance
On release the Valley of the Dolls long-player reached #51 in the UK Albums Chart.

Track listing

Original LP (1979)

Personnel
Generation X
 Billy Idol − vocals
 Tony James − bass, vocals
 Bob "Derwood" Andrews − guitar, vocals
 Mark Laff − drums, vocals
Additional musician
 Clive Bunker - drums
Technical
Gary Edwards - engineer
Peter Wagg - art direction
Janusz Guttner - design
Rod Delroy, Paddy Eckersley - photography

References

1979 albums
Generation X (band) albums
Chrysalis Records albums